Boris Loginow (born 9 February 1935) is a Venezuelan former sports shooter. He competed in the 50 metre rifle, prone event at the 1968 Summer Olympics.

References

External links
 

1935 births
Living people
Venezuelan male sport shooters
Olympic shooters of Venezuela
Shooters at the 1968 Summer Olympics
Yugoslav emigrants to Venezuela
20th-century Venezuelan people
21st-century Venezuelan people